Zdzisław Henryk Filipkiewicz (June 21, 1916 in Kraków – April 27, 1983 in Kraków) was a Polish basketball player who competed in the 1936 Summer Olympics.

He was part of the Polish basketball team, which finished fourth in the Olympic tournament. He played five matches.

References

External links
profile

1916 births
1983 deaths
Polish men's basketball players
Olympic basketball players of Poland
Basketball players at the 1936 Summer Olympics
Sportspeople from Kraków
Polish Austro-Hungarians